The following is a list of winners of the Golden Calf Culture Prize at the NFF.

 2021 - Will Koopman
 2020 - Mijke de Jong
 2019 - Jac. Goderie
 2018 - Monique van de Ven
 2017 - Gerard Soeteman
 2016 - Alex van Warmerdam & Marc van Warmerdam
 2015 - Sandra den Hamer
 2014 - Burny Bos
 2013 - Monique van Schendelen
 2012 - Willeke van Ammelrooy
 2010 - Rolf Orthel
 2009 - Doreen Boonekamp
 2008 - Rutger Hauer
 2007 - Robby Müller
 2006 - no award
 2005 - Hans Kemna
 2004 - no award
 2003 - Jan Decleir
 2002 - Louis van Gasteren
 2001 - René Scholten
 1999 - Matthijs van Heijningen
 1998 - Geoffrey Donaldson
 1997 - Robbert Wijsmuller
 1996 - Jeroen Krabbé
 1995 - Wim Verstappen
 1994 - Jan de Vaal
 1993 - Jan Blokker
 1992 - Paul Verhoeven
 1991 - De Filmkrant
 1990 - Jos Stelling
 1989 - Ellen Waller
 1988 - Johan van der Keuken
 1987 - Fons Rademakers
 1986 - Anton Koolhaas
 1985 - Joris Ivens
 1984 - J.M.L. Peters
 1983 - Bert Haanstra
 1982 - Dan Ireland
 1981 - J.G.J. Bosman

References

External links
 NFF Website

Culture Prize